Dil Awaiz is a 2022 Pakistani  television drama series that airs on Geo TV, written by Madiha Shahid, directed by Mazhar Moin and produced by Abdullah Kadwani and Asad Qureshi. The cast includes Azfar Rehman Kinza Hashmi, Affan Waheed, Seemi Raheel and Kashif Mahmood in a lead role.

Plot summary 

The plot revolves around a young naïve girl who is treated badly in her father's house as he was not happy at her birth due to her mother's past. Being deprived of her due respect, she leads a miserable life there. When her half-sister elopes from there, she is constrained to compromise and sacrifice herself by marrying Sikandar.

Cast 
 Kinza Hashmi in dual roles as Dil Awaiz and Sitara (Dil Awaiz's mother; a dancer)
 Affan Waheed as Sikandar
 Javeria Abbasi Roshan Ara
 Ayesha Gul as Durdana
 Kashif Mehmood as Nawab Shahbuddin, Dil Awaiz's father
 Asim Mehmood as Young Nawab Shahbuddin
 Sabeena Farooq as Fariya
 Seemi Raheel as Akka Bibi
 Yasra Rizvi as Tammana Khanum
 Jinaan Hussain as Gaiti
 Raeed Muhammad Alam as Kashan
 Fazila Qazi as Sikandar's mother
 Farhan Ally Agha as Sikandar's father

References

External links

2022 Pakistani television series debuts
Geo TV original programming
Pakistani drama television series